Tenacibaculum litopenaei is a Gram-negative, aerobic and rod-shaped bacterium from the genus of Tenacibaculum which has been isolated from a shrimp mariculture pond from Taiwan.

References

External links
Type strain of Tenacibaculum litopenaei at BacDive -  the Bacterial Diversity Metadatabase

Flavobacteria
Bacteria described in 2007